The Christmas Album is the tenth studio album by British-Australian soft rock duo Air Supply, released in 1987. It was their last studio album to be released under Arista Records.  The album features recordings of classic Christmas songs plus the two original songs, "Love Is All" and "The Eyes of a Child". There is a short instrumental version of "What Child Is This" in the track "Silent Night".

Track listing 
"White Christmas" (Irving Berlin) - 3:25
"The First Noel" (Traditional, William Sandys) - 3:23
"The Little Drummer Boy" (Katherine K. Davis, Henry Onorati, Harry Simeone) - 3:07
"The Eyes of a Child" (Graham Russell, Brendan Graham, Rolf Løvland, Ron Bloom) - 4:33
"Silent Night" (Franz Xaver Gruber, Joseph Mohr, John F. Young) - 3:08
"The Christmas Song" (Mel Torme, Robert Wells) - 3:01
"Sleigh Ride" (Leroy Anderson, Mitchell Parish) - 2:23
"Winter Wonderland" (Felix Bernard, Richard B. Smith) - 2:35
"O Come All Ye Faithful" (Frederick Oakeley, John Francis Wade) - 3:14
"Love Is All" (Russell, Billy Steinberg, Tom Kelly) - 4:30

Personnel 
 Russell Hitchcock and Graham Russell - lead vocals
 Linda Harmon, Russell Hitchcock, Edie Lehmann, Michael Lloyd, Patti Lloyd, Debbie Lytton, Jeni Lytton, Graham Russell - backing vocals
 Jim Cox, John Hobbs, Michael Lloyd - keyboards
 Laurence Juber, Graham Russell - guitar
 Dennis Belfield - bass guitar
 Ron Krasinski, Paul Leim - drums
 Alan Estes, Michael Fisher, Ron Krasinski, Bob Zimmitti - percussion
 Brian O'Connor, James Thatcher - French horn
 Ernie Carlson, Dick Hyde, Lew McCreary - trombone
 Stuart Blumberg, John Rosenberg - trumpet
 Don Ashworth, Jon Clarke, Ronald Jannelli, John Mitchell - woodwind
 Gayle Levant - harp
 Israel Baker, Arnold Belnick, Kenneth Burward-Hoy, Samuel Boghossian, Bonnie Douglas, Bruce Dukov, Arni Egilsson, Jesse Ehrlich, Henry Ferber, James Getzoff, Harris Goldman, V. Grahat, Endre Granat, Nathan Kaproff, Dennis Karmazyn, Ray Kelley, Jerome Kessler, Myra Kestenbaum, William Kurasch, Joy Lyle, Michael Markman, Donald McInnes, Buell Neidlinger, Michael Nowak, Stanley Plummer, David Shamban, Sidney Sharp, Harry Shultz, Tibor Zelig - strings
 Brass direction – John Rosenberg 
 Orchestra direction – Sidney Sharp
 Arrangements – John D'Andrea (1, 6–9) and Nick Strimple (2–5, 10)

Production 
 Producers – Russell Hitchcock, Graham Russell and Michael Lloyd.
 Executive Producer – Jimmy Ienner
 Engineer – Carmine Rubino
 Mixing – Jimmy Ienner, Michael Lloyd, Dan Nebenzal and Carmine Rubino.
 Art Direction and Design – Maude Gilman
 Photography – Robert Cohen

References

1987 Christmas albums
Christmas albums by Australian artists
Christmas albums by English artists
Air Supply albums
Albums produced by Jimmy Ienner
Albums produced by Graham Russell
Arista Records Christmas albums
Pop rock Christmas albums